Hesperocordulia is a genus of dragonflies in the family Austrocorduliidae,
endemic to south-western Australia.

Hesperocordulia is a monotypic genus with only one species, Hesperocordulia berthoudi,
known as the orange streamcruiser.
Hesperocordulia berthoudi is a medium-sized, orange, red and black dragonfly with clear wings and very long legs.
It inhabits streams, rivers and pools.

Gallery

Note about family
There are differing views as to the family that Hesperocordulia belongs to:
 It is considered to be part of the family Austrocorduliidae at the Australian Faunal Directory
 It is considered to be part of the family Synthemistidae in the World Odonata List at the Slater Museum of Natural History
 It is considered to be part of the family Corduliidae at Wikispecies
 In 2006 it was considered to be part of the family Oxygastridae in The Complete Field Guide to Dragonflies of Australia

See also
 List of Odonata species of Australia

References

Austrocorduliidae
Anisoptera genera
Monotypic Odonata genera
Odonata of Australia
Endemic fauna of Australia
Taxa named by Robert John Tillyard
Insects described in 1911